Government Junior College (GJC), at Gubbi is a prominent high school in Gubbi taluk of Tumkur district.

High schools and secondary schools in Karnataka
Schools in Tumkur district
Educational institutions established in 1963
1963 establishments in Mysore State